St Teresa's College, Abergowrie is an independent Catholic secondary day and boarding school for boys, located in Abergowrie, approximately  north west of Ingham, in Far North Queensland, Australia.

The school was established by the Congregation of Christian Brothers in 1933 and was called St Teresa's Agricultural College. Oversight of the school is managed by the Diocese of Townsville Catholic Education Office.

Overview 
The college enrols approximately 230 students who come from towns and communities from all across North Queensland as well as from Papua New Guinea. In 2010, St Teresa's College was recognised for its achievements in education being awarded the Deadly Award for the "Most Outstanding Achievement in Education".

The principal is Angus Galletly.

See also 

 Catholic education in Australia
 Lists of schools in Queensland
 List of Christian Brothers schools

References

External links 
 

Educational institutions established in 1933
Private schools in Queensland
Roman Catholic Diocese of Townsville
Former Congregation of Christian Brothers schools in Australia
1933 establishments in Australia
Catholic secondary schools in Queensland
Boys' schools in Queensland
Schools in Far North Queensland